Alquimia (Spanish for alchemy) may refer to:

Alquimia (band) salsa trio from Colombia
Alquimia album by Venezuelan gaita zuliana group Gran Coquivacoa 1997